Rasines is a municipality located in the autonomous community of Cantabria, Spain.

Localities
 Casavieja.
 Cereceda.
 El Cerro.
 La Edilla.
 Fresno.
 Helguera.
 Lombera.
 Ojébar.
 Rasines (Capital).
 Rocillo.
 Santa Cruz.
 Torcollano.
 La Vega.
 Villaparte.

References

Municipalities in Cantabria